Joseph Arthur Ridgway (born 25 April 1873) was an English footballer. His regular position was as a goalkeeper. He was born in Chorlton-cum-Hardy, Lancashire (now in the city of Manchester). He played for West Manchester, Manchester United, and Rochdale Town.

External links
profile

1873 births
English footballers
Manchester United F.C. players
Rochdale Town F.C. players
People from Chorlton-cum-Hardy
Year of death missing
Footballers from Manchester
Association football goalkeepers